The following is a list of Filipino swords and other Filipino weaponry in alphabetical order.

B 
 Balarao (Also spelled as balaraw, bararao or bararaw) Used throughout pre-colonial Philippines; Commonly used by Visayans and the Mandaya people, where it is known as bayadau or badao.
 Balasiong (Also spelled as balacion, baliciong or balisiong) Used by Muslim Filipino ethnolinguistic groups (especially the Moro people) in Southern Philippines.
 Balisword
 Bangkung
 Banyal  (Also known as banjal) Similar to the Bangkung.
 Barong - Used by the Tausug, Sama-Bajau and Yakan.
 Batangas
 Bolo - Also known as iták in Tagalog and binangon in Hiligaynon.
 Bolo-guna - Also known as guna.
 Bagobo - The Bagobo sword comes from The Bagobo people, a tribe that traces its origin from the people who brought Hinduism to Mindanao during the Sri Vijayan and Majapahit invasion. When the people inter-married with the locals, they formed a new society and came up with the name Bagobo.
 Bagakay - Bagakays can be either made of wood or steel depending on choice, wooden ones are more traditional, steel ones more modern. They have a point on both ends and are thrown similar to a knife but usually five at a time.
 Budjak (Also known as bangkaw, budjak, bodjak, budiak, sibat)
 Fan'-kao - Igorot version of the Budjak
 Kay-yan' - Igorot version of the Budjak
 Fal-fĕg' -  War spear of the Bontoc people
 Bangkon
 Bicuco
 Bunal - A club made from Rattan, Kamagong or Bahi. Usually a heavy stick with a wrapping for the grip area made out of goat skin
 Baston
 Bugsay oar (Karay-a)
 Buntot pagi
 Binacuco

D 
 Daga
 Dahong palay
 Dulo-dulo

E 

 Espada (Espada means sword in Cebuano and Hiligaynon)
 Espada Y Daga

G 

 Garab knife
 Garab sword
 Garab sickle
 Gayang
 Ginunting - Commonly used in the Philippine jungles, Ginunting was the official sword of the Philippine Marines, commonly seen together with their M16 rifles and other military weapons
 Gunong (Also known as puñal or puñal de kris)

H 

 Hagibis
 Haras

I 

 Itak
 Immigat

K 

 Kalis
 Kalasag
 Kampilan
 Kampilan bolo
 Katipunan bolo
 Kinabasi

L 

 Lahot (Also known as a gayong)
 Lantaka
 Laring

M 

 Maguindanao Kris Sword

O 

 Olis

P 

 Pakal
 Palm stick
 Paltik
 Paltik shotgun
 Pana
 Injun Pana
 Panabas Axe
 Pinutí (Also known as pinute)
 Pira cotabato

S 

 Sanduko bolo 
 Sanduko Y Daga
 Sansibar
 Sugob
 Sundang bolo
 Susuwat
 Sumpit
 Sinanbartolome
 Sinanduke
 Sinungot ulang

T 

 Tabak
 Talibon - The Talibong or Talibon is a sword that has an overstated belly and was commonly used by the ladies in the northern Philippines during the later part of the Spanish era and the early American regime. The Talibong was used as a hunting tool but during the Spanish era, it was carried by warriors to defend themselves
 Tenegre
 Tirador - A filipino Slingshot
 Tukon-Staff
 Tagan
 Tabak-Toyok
 Taming

U 

 Utak
 Uhas tari

V 

 Visayan Barong

W 

 War Golok - The Golok is the only sword in the Philippines that does not have a pointy tip; It inspired others such as the British Army Golok.
 Wasay Axe

Y 

 Yo-Yo - In the Philippines around 1500, the Yo-Yo was a weapon. It consisted of a four pound stone attached to a rope about 20 feet long. Tribesmen used it in two ways. When hunting, they stood off to one side, held one end of the rope and threw the rock towards the legs of an animal. The rope became tangled around the animals legs, and with a tug, the hunter brought the animal down. Against enemies, the stones would be dropped on their heads. The tribesmen would quickly recover the stones, ready for a second blow if necessary

Footnotes

References 

Filipino weaponry
Weaponry
Philippines military-related lists
Weapons of the Philippines